Lord Ulrich III of Hanau ( – 1369 or 1370; buried in the Arnsburg Abbey) was Lord of Hanau from 1346 until his death. He was also governor in the Wetterau.

Background 
Ulrich III was born around 1310, as the eldest son of Ulrich II of Hanau and his wife, Agnes of Hohenlohe-Weikersheim. The year of his birth is inferred from the facts that his parents married in 1310, and that Ulrich III was considered old enough to marry in 1327.

Reign 
Ulrich III was politically active even before his father died in 1346. From 1343, he acted as regent of Falkenstein-Münzenberg, together with Count Kuno of Falkenstein.

In the years 1349 and 1357, two black death epidemics struck Germany. There is no historical account of how badly Hanau was affected. In neighbouring Frankfurt, 2000 people are reported to have died within 200 days. Ulrich III and his relatives were apparently not personally affected, as there are no deaths in his family that can be attributed to these epidemics. There was, however, a pogrom against the Jews in Hanau. They were accused of arson and exiled from the city.

Domestic policies 
Fiscal policy in the Lordship of Hanau was apparently very successful under his reign. Despite his costly military campaigns, and feuds, he possessed more than enough money to grant loans to his allies, to redeem his own mortgages and to purchase mortgages and territories.

In 1368 he obtained town privileges for his villages Bruchköbel and Marköbel from the king. However, this turned out to not have any consequences for their development. The king also granted him the right of minting for the city of Babenhausen.

During his reign, there are an increasing number of conflicts between the territorial rulers in the area and the city of Frankfurt, as more and more people migrate from the rural areas to the city, depriving the territorial rulers of subjects and tax revenue.

Imperial policies 
Ulrich III continued the imperial policy of his predecessors. This allowed him to strengthen his right hand around Frankfurt, especially in the district of Bornheimerberg. In 1349, he extended credit to the Emperor and in return received the office of imperial Schultheiß of Frankfurt as a lien. In 1360, he also received the office of imperial Schultheiß of the Frankfurt City Forest as a line securing more credit. The Frankfurt City Forest formed the southern border of the city of Frankfurt. The citizens of Frankfurt felt that Ulrich III was undermining their independence by encircling the site inside and out, since he also held the district of Bornheimerberg, which completely surrounded the city on its northern border, and he held to office of Schultheiß inside the city. There was an ongoing conflict in the City between the aristocrats and the craftsmen; from 1358 Ulrich mediated in this conflict.

Another aspect of this encirclement was the Ulrichstein Tower, a stronghold and customs tower in Sachsenhausen, Frankfurt's bridgehead on the south bank of the Main. There is a theory that it may have been originally built by Lord Ulrich I of Münzenberg (1217–1240). The tower was part of the defensive wall around the city, but it also helped Ulrich to protect his interests. The existence of the tower is first mentioned in an overview of Frankfurt's city gates and towers from 1391.

In order to break Ulrich's encirclement, the aristocrat and later mayor of Frankfurt Siegfried zum Paradies, who had excellent relations with the emperor, redeemed the mortgages and took up the office of Schultheiß himself. The emperor probably preferred politically a wealthy city over a powerful territorial ruler.

In 1354, Ulrich secured control over Schelmenburg Castle, the seat of the Schelme von Bergen family in what is now the Bergen-Enkheim district of Frankfurt. He also acquired shares in the districts of Altenhaßlau and Jossgrund and in the justice over the Ortenberg district. He rounded off the boundaries of Hanau purchasing land and liens. In 1357, he acquired some fiefs from the Fulda monastery and shares in the villages Somborn, Alzenau, Wilmundsheim vor der Hart and Hörstein, all in the shire of Alzenau. He also acquired a one-sixth share of the districts of Münzenberg and Assenheim and a share of Gronau. In 1367, he increased his share in Rodheim, a village held jointly by Hanau and Falkenstein.

He participated in the Diets in Metz and Nuremberg in 1356, during which the Golden Bull was issued. From Emperor Charles IV, he received toll privileges in Steinau an der Straße (on the trade route from Frankfurt to Leipzig), in Sterbfritz (on the route from Fulda to Würzburg) and in Kesselstadt at the bank of the river Main.

In 1363 and 1364, he participated in military actions of the Teutonic Knights in Prussia.

Governor in the Wetterau 
Ulrich III actively participated in regional politics. On 8 June 1349, Emperor Charles IV appointed him governor in the Wetterau. In this position, he repeatedly fought major noblemen in the area in the 1356-1366 period. Among them were Philip of Isenburg-Grenzau, whose Vilmar Castle he took in 1359, and from 1364 to 1366, Philip the Elder of Falkenstein, who was allied with the imperial cities of Frankfurt, Friedberg, Wetzlar and Gelnhausen and Archbishop Kuno of Trier.

Coat of arms 

The coat of arms of the Lordship of Hanau reached its final form during Ulrich III's reign. The similarity with the coat of arms of the County of Rieneck and the fact that they used the same crest gave rise to a dispute. The dispute was resolved in 1367 with a compromise: Rieneck would use a standing swan, Hanau would use a growing half swan. The city of Hanau still uses the coat of arms in this form today.

Marriage and issue 
Ulrich III married in 1327 or later to Countess Adelaide of Nassau, the daughter of Count Gerlach I of Nassau. She died on 8 August 1344 and was buried in Arnsburg Abbey. Her grave stone has survived. They had at least five children. The order in which the children were born, is not known, although we can infer that Ulrich IV was the eldest son from the fact that he was the heir.
 Ulrich IV ( – 1380), his successor
 Reinhard ( – early 15th century), a canon at Würzburg and Mainz
 Elisabeth ( – after 1384), married William II, Count of Katzenelnbogen
 Agnes, mentioned in 1346 as a nun in Klarenthal Abbey in Wiesbaden.
 Anna, mentioned in 1396 as abbess of Patershausen Abbey

Ancestors

References 
 Walter Czysz: Klarenthal bei Wiesbaden. Ein Frauenkloster im Mittelalter 1298 - 1559, Wiesbaden, 1987, 
 Klaus Peter Decker: Klientel und Konkurrenz. Die ritterschaftliche Familie von Hutten und die Grafen von Hanau und von Ysenburg, in: Hessisches Jahrbuch für Landesgeschichte, vol. 38, Marburg, 1988, p. 23–48, 
 Reinhard Dietrich: Die Landesverfassung in dem Hanauischen, in the series Hanauer Geschichtsblätter, vol. 34, Hanau, 1996, 
 Karl Ebel: Der Reichskrieg gegen Philipp d.Ä. von Falkenstein 1364–1366, in: Mitteilungen des Oberhessischen Geschichtsvereins, vol. 23, Neustadt an der Aisch, 1915, p. 129-142, 
 Rehm: Diplomatische Geschichte der Herren und Grafen von Hanau, in: Zeitschrift des Vereins für hessische Geschichte und Landeskunde, new series, vol. 3, Kassel 1871, p. 197–200
 
 Fred Schwind: Die Landvogtei in der Wetterau, thesis, Frankfurt, 1972
 Reinhard Suchier: Genealogie des Hanauer Grafenhauses, in: Festschrift des Hanauer Geschichtsvereins zu seiner fünfzigjährigen Jubelfeier am 27. August 1894, Hanau, 1894.
 Ernst J. Zimmermann: Hanau Stadt und Land, 3rd ed., Hanau, 1919, reprinted 1978,

Footnotes 

Lords of Hanau
History of Frankfurt
Main-Kinzig-Kreis
1310 births
14th-century deaths
Year of birth uncertain
Year of death uncertain
14th-century German nobility
14th-century rulers in Europe